The Gave d'Ossau is the torrential river flowing through the Ossau Valley, one of the three main valleys of the High-Béarn (Pyrénées-Atlantiques), in the Southwest of France.

It is formed in Gabas from the confluence of two gaves coming from both sides of the Pic du Midi d'Ossau:
 the Gave de Bious, from the Pic d'Astu (west)
 the Gave du Brousset, from the Anéou Circus (east).

After joining the Gave d'Aspe, in Oloron-Sainte-Marie, it forms the Gave d'Oloron. It is considered the upper course of the Gave d'Oloron by Sandre.

Throughout its length, the river is paralleled by the D934 road that runs from Pau to Spain, via the Col du Pourtalet.

In Castet, a dam forms the Lac de Castet.

Main tributaries 
 (R) Gave de Soussouéou
 (L) Gée from the Coig Arras, in the Gorges du Bitet
 (R) Valentin, from Gourette
 (R) Cély, from the Col d'Aubisque
 (L) l'Arrioutort, in Laruns
 (R) Canceigt.
 (R) Sourde, in Aste.
 (L) Arriou Mage, in Bielle.
 (R) Lau.

Départements and towns
 Pyrénées-Atlantiques: Gabas, Eaux-Chaudes, Laruns, Béost, Aste-Béon, Gère-Bélesten, Bielle, Castet, Louvie-Juzon, Izeste, Arudy, Oloron-Sainte-Marie.

References

External links
Ossau.net web site

Rivers of France
Rivers of Pyrénées-Atlantiques
Rivers of Nouvelle-Aquitaine